The 5th Kisei was a Go competition, the 5th edition of the Kisei tournament. Since Fujisawa Hideyuki won the previous year, he is given an automatic place in the final. Eight players battled in a knockout tournament to decide the final 2. Those two would then play each other in a best-of-3 match to decide who would face Fujisawa. Otake Hideo became the challenger after beating Cho Chikun 2 games to 1, but would lose 4 games to 0 against Fujisawa.

Main tournament

Challenger finals

Finals

References 

Kisei (Go)
1981 in go